Sadat is a 1983 American two-part, four-hour made-for-television biographical film based on the life and death of the late 3rd President of Egypt, Anwar Sadat, starring Louis Gossett Jr. as Sadat and Madolyn Smith as Sadat's wife, Jehan. It was distributed by Columbia Pictures Television through Operation Prime Time. Gossett's performance earned him a nomination for an Emmy Award and a Golden Globe Award.

Plot
The film begins by depicting Sadat's involvement with violent anti-British insurgents. Eventually he becomes a follower of Gamal Abdel Nasser (John Rhys-Davies) as the latter begins his ascent to political supremacy in Egypt. As Egypt becomes more of a regional power led by Nasser, Sadat suffers the strain of being Nasser's yes man, while clashing with him. Nasser enjoys widespread popularity once he nationalizes the Suez Canal, but suffers a fatal downfall in the wake of Egypt's crushing defeat in the Six-Day War.

Eventually succeeding Nasser, Sadat finds himself beholden to the Soviets for military assistance. The Soviets know the Egyptians are determined to go to war with Israel and reclaim the Sinai, but doubt that Egypt's military can cross the Suez without their help. Determined to make the Egyptians masters of their own nation, Sadat forgoes Soviet assistance (and their influence). In October 1973, Egypt and Syria launch a two-front attack on Israel. Egypt's planning proves immensely successful at the outset, building on a well-executed amphibious crossing of the Suez. Egyptian air defense units hold off Israel's Air Force, depriving soldiers on the ground of air support. The assault founders when an Israeli tank unit led by Ariel Sharon holds its own without air support. Sadat also suffers the loss of a relative shot down during the war.

Ultimately, Sadat realizes the futility of war, and seeks a peaceful dialog with Israel, leading up to his meetings with Menachem Begin (Barry Morse).  While the resulting Israeli-Egyptian peace treaty normalizes relations between Egypt and the west, in the midst of the Israeli occupation of Palestine greatly alienates Sadat from the rest of the Arab world.

On October 6, 1981, Sadat is assassinated as he and several foreign dignitaries review a military procession marking the 1973 crossing of the Suez.

Cast 

Louis Gossett Jr. as Anwar al-Sadat
John Rhys-Davies as Gamal Abdel Nasser
Madolyn Smith as Jihan Sadat
Jeremy Kemp as Thompson
Reuven Bar-Yotam as Sibai
Eric Berry as Rashad
Anne Heywood as Mrs. Raouf
Ferdy Mayne as Mullah (as Ferdinand Mayne)
Barry Morse as Menachem Begin
Thaao Penghlis as Amer
Nehemiah Persoff as Leonid Brezhnev
Pepe Serna as Atif Sadat
Paul L. Smith as King Farouk
Jeffrey Tambor as Sharaff
Aharon Ipalé as Israeli Man
Richard Kuss as Boldorov
Hugh Gillin as American Ambassador
George Morfogen as Salem
James Garrett as British Corporal
Judith Penrod as TV Reporter
James O'Sullivan as Jordan
Alexander Zale as Shafi
Tony Plana as Dentist
James Staley as Williams
Nick Faltas as Raouf
Dennis Howard as Elliot Richardson
David Hess as Israeli Soldier
Michael Saad as Libyan
Walt Hanna as Jimmy Carter
Gertrudis Kuntz as Golda Meir
Ben Slack as Ariel Sharon
Joe Renteria as Egyptian Soldier
Mohamed Abdul Kheir as Wedding Mullah
Nathan Lam as Rabbi

Reception
The film was negatively received in Egypt and was accused there of distorting history and slandering the Egyptian people, and was also criticized for the casting of a black actor, Lou Gossett, Jr., as Sadat. The Egyptian Ministry of Culture announced a ban on all films and television programs distributed by Columbia Pictures, and Egypt's artists' and film unions sued Columbia Pictures and the film's director, writer, and producers. The lawsuit was dismissed by an Egyptian court for lack of jurisdiction because the film's "distortions" and "slanders" occurred outside Egypt. Director Michaels said that the Egyptian government deserved the 1984 "overreaction award" for its handling of the miniseries.

References

External links 
 
 The full translated movie https://www.youtube.com/watch?v=gwwYARiWon0

1983 television films
1983 films
1980s biographical films
1983 drama films
Operation Prime Time
Films scored by Charles Bernstein
Television series by Sony Pictures Television
Works about Anwar Sadat
Television shows set in Egypt
Cultural depictions of Anwar Sadat
Cultural depictions of Golda Meir
Cultural depictions of Jimmy Carter
Cultural depictions of Leonid Brezhnev
Cultural depictions of Gamal Abdel Nasser
Cultural depictions of Menachem Begin
Films directed by Richard Michaels
1980s English-language films